Jaime Daniel Quiyuch Castañeda (born 24 April 1988 in Guatemala City) is a Guatemalan race walker. He competed in the 50 kilometres walk event at the 2012 and 2016 Summer Olympics.

Personal bests

Achievements

References

External links

Tilastopaja biography

Sportspeople from Guatemala City
Guatemalan male racewalkers
1988 births
Living people
Olympic athletes of Guatemala
Athletes (track and field) at the 2012 Summer Olympics
Athletes (track and field) at the 2016 Summer Olympics
World Athletics Championships athletes for Guatemala
Pan American Games medalists in athletics (track and field)
Pan American Games bronze medalists for Guatemala
Athletes (track and field) at the 2011 Pan American Games
Competitors at the 2014 Central American and Caribbean Games
Medalists at the 2011 Pan American Games
20th-century Guatemalan people
21st-century Guatemalan people